Polyorthini is a tribe of moths in the family Tortricidae.

Genera 
Apura
Ardeutica
Biclonuncaria
Chlorortha
Clonuncaria
Cnephasitis
Ebodina
Epelebodina
Histura
Histurodes
Isotrias
Lopharcha
Lophoprora
Lypothora
Olindia
Polylopha
Polyortha
Polythora
†Polyvena
Pseudatteria
Pseuduncifera
Scytalognatha
Sociosa
Thaumatoptila
Xeneboda

Formerly placed here
Macasinia
Orthocomotis

References

 , 2005: World catalogue of insects volume 5 Tortricidae.
 , 2012: Tortricines in the fauna of Nepal (Lepidoptera: Tortricidae). Polish Journal of Entomology 81 (1): 91-99. Full article: .
 , 2011: Systematic and faunistic data on Neotropical Tortricidae: Phricanthini, Tortricini, Atteriini, Polyorthini, Chlidanotini (Lepidoptera: Tortricidae). Shilap Revista de Lepidopterologia 39 (154): 161-181. Full article: .
 , 2010: Some Tortricidae from the East Cordillera in Ecuador reared from larvae in Yanayacu Biological Station in Ecuador (Insecta: Lepidoptera). Genus 21 (4): 585-603. Full article: .
 , 2010: Tortricidae (Lepidoptera) from Peru. Acta Zoologica Cracoviensia 53B (1-2): 73-159. . Full article: .